William John "Scotty" Ingerton (April 19, 1886 – June 15, 1956) was a Major League Baseball player.

Ingerton was born in Peninsula, Ohio and died in Cleveland, Ohio.

External links

Boston Rustlers players
1886 births
1956 deaths
Baseball players from Ohio
Zanesville Moguls players
Marion Moguls players
Albany Senators players
Altoona Rams players
Indianapolis Indians players
Louisville Colonels (minor league) players
Ridgway (minor league baseball) players
Newport News Shipbuilders players